is a JR West Geibi Line station located in Ibara, Shiraki-chō, Asakita-ku, Hiroshima, Hiroshima Prefecture, Japan.  This is the final of fifteen Geibi Line station within the boundaries of the city of Hiroshima.

History 
 1915-04-28: Ibaraichi Station opens
 1987-04-01: Japan National Railways is privatized, and Ibaraichi Station becomes a JR West station

Station building and platforms 
Ibaraichi Station features one raised side platform, capable of handling one line.  Due to previously handling large amounts of freight traffics, the train yard is very large.  The station building is an unusual shape due to countless renovations and additions since being opened.  It is an older-style wooden building with a tile roof. Ibaraichi Station is currently an unmanned station.

Environs 
 Ibara Post Office
 Hiroshima Prefectural Ibara Elementary School
 JA Rice Center
 Misasa River
 Arataniyama

Highway access 
 Hiroshima Prefectural Route 37 (Hiroshima-Miyoshi Route)
 Hiroshima Prefectural Route 68 (Ōbayashi-Ibara Route)
 Hiroshima Prefectural Route 226 (Ibaraichi Teishajō Route)

Connecting lines 
All lines are JR West lines. 
Geibi Line
Commuter Liner/Local
Mukaihara Station — Ibaraichi Station — Shiwaguchi Station

External links 
 JR West

Railway stations in Hiroshima Prefecture
Geibi Line
Stations of West Japan Railway Company in Hiroshima city
Railway stations in Japan opened in 1915